Santa Eulalia (also known as  in Qʼanjobʼal) is a municipality located in the north-east of the department of Huehuetenango, Guatemala, Central America. This town is rich in culture and traditions. The majority of people here speak the Q'anjob'al language.

The annual celebrations in honor of the town's patron saint, Saint Eulalia takes place from 8 February and culminates in its main celebration day the 12th.

External links
Santa Eulalia at Maya Vision US 
Santa Eulalia US 
Santa Eulalia at Xunmat.com 

Municipalities of the Huehuetenango Department